Warszawa Środmieście  may refer to
 Śródmieście, Warsaw borough of Warsaw
 Warszawa Śródmieście PKP station
 Warszawa Śródmieście WKD station